The following is a list of players, both past and current, who played in at least in one game for the Seattle SuperSonics (1967–2008) or Oklahoma City Thunder (2008–present) National Basketball Association (NBA) franchise.



Players
Note: Statistics are correct through the end of the  season.

A to B

|-
|align="left"| || align="center"|F/C || align="left"|Iowa State || align="center"|3 || align="center"|– || 146 || 3,279 || 1,198 || 182 || 1,549 || 22.5 || 8.2 || 1.2 || 10.6 || align=center|
|-
|align="left"| || align="center"|G/F || align="left"|Spain || align="center"|3 || align="center"|– || 174 || 2,777 || 248 || 88 || 924 || 16.0 || 1.4 || 0.5 || 5.3 || align=center|
|-
|align="left"| || align="center"|C || align="left"|Pittsburgh || align="center"|6 || align="center"|– || 467 || 12,527 || 3,446 || 469 || 4,507 || 26.8 || 7.4 || 1.0 || 9.7 || align=center|
|-
|align="left"| || align="center"|F/C || align="left"|Morehead State || align="center"|1 || align="center"| || 36 || 259 || 57 || 14 || 112 || 7.2 || 1.6 || 0.4 || 3.1 || align=center|
|-
|align="left"| || align="center"|C || align="left"|Kansas || align="center"|2 || align="center"|– || 44 || 315 || 83 || 7 || 75 || 7.2 || 1.9 || 0.2 || 1.7 || align=center|
|-
|align="left"| || align="center"|G || align="left"|UCLA || align="center"|1 || align="center"| || 81 || 1,817 || 211 || 342 || 794 || 22.4 || 2.6 || 4.2 || 9.8 || align=center|
|-
|align="left" bgcolor="#FFFF99"|^ || align="center"|G || align="left"|UConn || align="center"|5 || align="center"|– || 296 || 11,654 || 1,375 || 1,241 || 7,273 || 39.4 || 4.6 || 4.2 || 24.6 || align=center|
|-
|align="left"| || align="center"|G || align="left"|Memphis || align="center"|1 || align="center"| || 1 || 15 || 1 || 0 || 2 || 15.0 || 1.0 || 0.0 || 2.0 || align=center|
|-
|align="left"| || align="center"|G || align="left"|Georgia Tech || align="center"|1 || align="center"| || 38 || 689 || 87 || 121 || 233 || 18.1 || 2.3 || 3.2 || 6.1 || align=center|
|-
|align="left"| || align="center"|F || align="left"|Syracuse || align="center"|1 || align="center"| || 78 || 2,501 || 453 || 103 || 1,261 || 32.1 || 5.8 || 1.3 || 16.2 || align=center|
|-
|align="left"| || align="center"|G || align="left"|UNLV || align="center"|1 || align="center"| || 80 || 1,021 || 111 || 205 || 419 || 12.8 || 1.4 || 2.6 || 5.2 || align=center|
|-
|align="left"| || align="center"|G/F || align="left"|Memphis || align="center"|4 || align="center"|– || 284 || 6,189 || 733 || 650 || 2,396 || 21.8 || 2.6 || 2.3 || 8.4 || align=center|
|-
|align="left"| || align="center"|G || align="left"|South Florida || align="center"|1 || align="center"| || 19 || 297 || 18 || 31 || 71 || 15.6 || 0.9 || 1.6 || 3.7 || align=center|
|-
|align="left"| || align="center"|G || align="left"|Texas || align="center"|2 || align="center"|– || 62 || 1,196 || 104 || 154 || 345 || 19.3 || 1.7 || 2.5 || 5.6 || align=center|
|-
|align="left"| || align="center"|C || align="left"|Santa Clara || align="center"|2 || align="center"| || 87 || 1,106 || 212 || 103 || 181 || 12.7 || 2.4 || 1.2 || 2.1 || align=center|
|-
|align="left"| || align="center"|F/C || align="left"|Rutgers || align="center"|3 || align="center"|– || 159 || 3,445 || 852 || 139 || 1,523 || 21.7 || 5.4 || 0.9 || 9.6 || align=center|
|-
|align="left" bgcolor="#FFCC00"|+ || align="center"|F || align="left"|Hartford || align="center"|5 || align="center"|– || 326 || 10,794 || 2,252 || 518 || 5,054 || 33.1 || 6.9 || 1.6 || 15.5 || align=center|
|-
|align="left"| || align="center"|F || align="left"|Oregon || align="center"|1 || align="center"| || 2 || 15 || 7 || 0 || 6 || 7.5 || 3.5 || 0.0 || 3.0 || align=center|
|-
|align="left"| || align="center"|F/C || align="left"|Saint Joseph's || align="center"|2 || align="center"|– || 110 || 2,298 || 554 || 154 || 887 || 20.9 || 5.0 || 1.4 || 8.1 || align=center|
|-
|align="left"| || align="center"|G || align="left"|Washington State || align="center"|1 || align="center"| || 4 || 10 || 3 || 1 || 4 || 2.5 || 0.8 || 0.3 || 1.0 || align=center|
|-
|align="left"| || align="center"|G || align="left"|Boston College || align="center"|4 || align="center"|– || 291 || 4,954 || 391 || 592 || 2,360 || 17.0 || 1.3 || 2.0 || 8.1 || align=center|
|-
|align="left"| || align="center"|G || align="left"|Oregon State || align="center"|5 || align="center"|– || 362 || 11,827 || 1,529 || 1,668 || 4,107 || 32.7 || 4.2 || 4.6 || 11.3 || align=center|
|-
|align="left"| || align="center"|G || align="left"|Georgia Tech || align="center"|1 || align="center"| || 17 || 183 || 20 || 29 || 37 || 10.8 || 1.2 || 1.7 || 2.2 || align=center|
|-
|align="left"| || align="center"|G || align="left"|Louisville || align="center"|1 || align="center"| || 73 || 1,403 || 174 || 247 || 482 || 19.2 || 2.4 || 3.4 || 6.6 || align=center|
|-
|align="left"| || align="center"|C || align="left"|Creighton || align="center"|3 || align="center"|– || 125 || 3,288 || 880 || 133 || 1,489 || 26.3 || 7.0 || 1.1 || 11.9 || align=center|
|-
|align="left"| || align="center"|C || align="left"|South Dakota State || align="center"|1 || align="center"| || 55 || 773 || 225 || 42 || 273 || 14.1 || 4.1 || 0.8 || 5.0 || align=center|
|-
|align="left"| || align="center"|F || align="left"|Wisconsin || align="center"|1 || align="center"| || 60 || 551 || 96 || 26 || 202 || 9.2 || 1.6 || 0.4 || 3.4 || align=center|
|-
|align="left"| || align="center"|C || align="left"|Penn State || align="center"|3 || align="center"|– || 133 || 2,060 || 443 || 56 || 576 || 15.5 || 3.3 || 0.4 || 4.3 || align=center|
|-
|align="left"| || align="center"|F || align="left"|Kansas State || align="center"|1 || align="center"| || 82 || 2,549 || 717 || 110 || 1,249 || 31.1 || 8.7 || 1.3 || 15.2 || align=center|
|-
|align="left"| || align="center"|F || align="left"|Cuba || align="center"|1 || align="center"| || 17 || 167 || 40 || 10 || 62 || 9.8 || 2.4 || 0.6 || 3.6 || align=center|
|-
|align="left"| || align="center"|F || align="left"|Iowa || align="center"|1 || align="center"| || 1 || 8 || 2 || 0 || 4 || 8.0 || 2.0 || 0.0 || 4.0 || align=center|
|-
|align="left"| || align="center"|G || align="left"|Wyoming || align="center"|1 || align="center"| || 8 || 39 || 3 || 5 || 11 || 4.9 || 0.4 || 0.6 || 1.4 || align=center|
|-
|align="left"| || align="center"|G/F || align="left"|Florida || align="center"|1 || align="center"| || 18 || 514 || 61 || 24 || 182 || 28.6 || 3.4 || 1.3 || 10.1 || align=center|
|-
|align="left"| || align="center"|G/F || align="left"|Arkansas || align="center"|1 || align="center"| || 14 || 142 || 40 || 10 || 13 || 10.1 || 2.9 || 0.7 || 0.9 || align=center|
|-
|align="left"| || align="center"|F/C || align="left"|Penn State || align="center"|3 || align="center"|– || 181 || 2,412 || 465 || 179 || 802 || 13.3 || 2.6 || 1.0 || 4.4 || align=center|
|-
|align="left"| || align="center"|G/F || align="left"|Toledo || align="center"|3 || align="center"|– || 126 || 2,626 || 498 || 225 || 1,498 || 20.8 || 4.0 || 1.8 || 11.9 || align=center|
|-
|align="left"| || align="center"|F || align="left"|DePaul || align="center"|1 || align="center"| || 38 || 271 || 74 || 2 || 93 || 7.1 || 1.9 || 0.1 || 2.4 || align=center|
|-
|align="left" bgcolor="#FFCC00"|+ (#32) || align="center"|G || align="left"|Iowa || align="center"|13 || align="center"|– || 963 || 24,422 || 2,637 || 3,160 || 14,018 || 25.4 || 2.7 || 3.3 || 14.6 || align=center|
|-
|align="left"| || align="center"|G/F || align="left"|Arkansas || align="center"|1 || align="center"| || 35 || 401 || 56 || 32 || 168 || 11.5 || 1.6 || 0.9 || 4.8 || align=center|
|-
|align="left"| || align="center"|G || align="left"|Temple || align="center"|1 || align="center"| || 4 || 31 || 2 || 2 || 10 || 7.8 || 0.5 || 0.5 || 2.5 || align=center|
|-
|align="left"| || align="center"|C || align="left"|NC State || align="center"|3 || align="center"|– || 246 || 6,338 || 1,865 || 388 || 2,905 || 25.8 || 7.6 || 1.6 || 11.8 || align=center|
|-
|align="left" bgcolor="#CCFFCC"|x || align="center"|G || align="left"|Iowa State || align="center"|1 || align="center"| || 32 || 240 || 28 || 9 || 82 || 7.5 || 0.9 || 0.3 || 2.6 || align=center|
|-
|align="left"| || align="center"|F || align="left"|UConn || align="center"|1 || align="center"| || 22 || 598 || 71 || 26 || 213 || 27.2 || 3.2 || 1.2 || 9.7 || align=center|
|}

C

|-
|align="left"| || align="center"|F/C || align="left"|San Diego State || align="center"|6 || align="center"|– || 490 || 13,597 || 3,975 || 491 || 3,742 || 27.7 || 8.1 || 1.0 || 7.6 || align=center|
|-
|align="left"| || align="center"|C || align="left"|Clemson || align="center"|1 || align="center"| || 15 || 184 || 39 || 9 || 48 || 12.3 || 2.6 || 0.6 || 3.2 || align=center|
|-
|align="left"| || align="center"|C || align="left"|Oregon || align="center"|1 || align="center"| || 28 || 279 || 73 || 13 || 72 || 10.0 || 2.6 || 0.5 || 2.6 || align=center|
|-
|align="left"| || align="center"|C || align="left"|San Francisco || align="center"|1 || align="center"| || 29 || 430 || 87 || 10 || 69 || 14.8 || 3.0 || 0.3 || 2.4 || align=center|
|-
|align="left" bgcolor="#FFCC00"|+ || align="center"|F/C || align="left"|Utah || align="center"|5 || align="center"|– || 393 || 13,210 || 2,577 || 931 || 8,028 || 33.6 || 6.6 || 2.4 || 20.4 || align=center|
|-
|align="left"| || align="center"|F || align="left"|Gonzaga || align="center"|1 || align="center"| || 2 || 4 || 0 || 0 || 0 || 2.0 || 0.0 || 0.0 || 0.0 || align=center|
|-
|align="left"| || align="center"|G || align="left"|Xavier || align="center"|1 || align="center"| || 64 || 973 || 87 || 130 || 183 || 15.2 || 1.4 || 2.0 || 2.9 || align=center|
|-
|align="left"| || align="center"|G || align="left"|Minnesota || align="center"|1 || align="center"| || 77 || 2,481 || 235 || 433 || 1,071 || 32.2 || 3.1 || 5.6 || 13.9 || align=center|
|-
|align="left"| || align="center"|G || align="left"|Michigan State || align="center"|2 || align="center"|– || 41 || 295 || 20 || 49 || 86 || 7.2 || 0.5 || 1.2 || 2.1 || align=center|
|-
|align="left"| || align="center"|F || align="left"|Ohio Wesleyan || align="center"|3 || align="center"|– || 238 || 4,220 || 847 || 272 || 1,808 || 17.7 || 3.6 || 1.1 || 7.6 || align=center|
|-
|align="left"| || align="center"|G || align="left"|Cleveland State || align="center"|1 || align="center"| || 13 || 125 || 11 || 14 || 43 || 9.6 || 0.8 || 1.1 || 3.3 || align=center|
|-
|align="left"| (#4) || align="center"|F || align="left"|Kansas || align="center" bgcolor="#CFECEC"|14 || align="center"|– || 910 || 18,603 || 4,701 || 939 || 5,359 || 20.4 || 5.2 || 1.0 || 5.9 || align=center|
|-
|align="left"| || align="center"|F/C || align="left"|Providence || align="center"|1 || align="center"| || 45 || 381 || 69 || 12 || 120 || 8.5 || 1.5 || 0.3 || 2.7 || align=center|
|-
|align="left"| || align="center"|G || align="left"|Ohio State || align="center"|2 || align="center"|– || 100 || 1,587 || 194 || 35 || 550 || 15.9 || 1.9 || 0.4 || 5.5 || align=center|
|-
|align="left"| || align="center"|F/C || align="left"|Colorado || align="center"|1 || align="center"| || 3 || 45 || 9 || 2 || 17 || 15.0 || 3.0 || 0.7 || 5.7 || align=center|
|-
|align="left"| || align="center"|C || align="left"|DePaul || align="center"|1 || align="center"| || 28 || 147 || 33 || 4 || 47 || 5.3 || 1.2 || 0.1 || 1.7 || align=center|
|-
|align="left"| || align="center"|G || align="left"|Long Beach State || align="center"|2 || align="center"|– || 19 || 92 || 16 || 0 || 49 || 4.8 || 0.8 || 0.0 || 2.6 || align=center|
|-
|align="left"| || align="center"|F/C || align="left"|San Francisco || align="center"|3 || align="center"|– || 179 || 3,751 || 1,515 || 187 || 1,057 || 21.0 || 8.5 || 1.0 || 5.9 || align=center|
|-
|align="left"| || align="center"|G || align="left"|Virginia || align="center"|1 || align="center"| || 24 || 363 || 30 || 58 || 147 || 15.1 || 1.3 || 2.4 || 6.1 || align=center|
|-
|align="left"| || align="center"|F || align="left"|DePaul || align="center"|1 || align="center"| || 45 || 828 || 183 || 39 || 370 || 18.4 || 4.1 || 0.9 || 8.2 || align=center|
|}

D to E

|-
|align="left"| || align="center"|G || align="left"|San Francisco || align="center"|3 || align="center"|– || 71 || 888 || 95 || 54 || 462 || 12.5 || 1.3 || 0.8 || 6.5 || align=center|
|-
|align="left"| || align="center"|G || align="left"|Bowling Green || align="center"|2 || align="center"|– || 146 || 3,538 || 311 || 607 || 1,414 || 24.2 || 2.1 || 4.2 || 9.7 || align=center|
|-
|align="left"| || align="center"|G || align="left"|Delaware State || align="center"|2 || align="center"|– || 116 || 1,991 || 254 || 207 || 578 || 17.2 || 2.2 || 1.8 || 5.0 || align=center|
|-
|align="left"| || align="center"|C || align="left"|Texas A&M || align="center"|1 || align="center"| || 1 || 1 || 1 || 0 || 0 || 1.0 || 1.0 || 0.0 || 0.0 || align=center|
|-
|align="left"| || align="center"|G || align="left"|Seattle || align="center"|2 || align="center"|– || 107 || 1,005 || 86 || 71 || 518 || 9.4 || 0.8 || 0.7 || 4.8 || align=center|
|-
|align="left" bgcolor="#CCFFCC"|x || align="center"|G || align="left"|Kentucky || align="center"|1 || align="center"| || 51 || 526 || 97 || 17 || 190 || 10.3 || 1.9 || 0.3 || 3.7 || align=center|
|-
|align="left"| || align="center"|C || align="left"|Washington State || align="center"|3 || align="center"|– || 232 || 4,479 || 1,300 || 190 || 1,748 || 19.3 || 5.6 || 0.8 || 7.5 || align=center|
|-
|align="left"| || align="center"|F || align="left"|Georgia || align="center"|1 || align="center"| || 29 || 253 || 88 || 9 || 53 || 8.7 || 3.0 || 0.3 || 1.8 || align=center|
|-
|align="left"| || align="center"|G || align="left"|South Carolina || align="center"|1 || align="center"| || 2 || 3 || 1 || 0 || 2 || 1.5 || 0.5 || 0.0 || 1.0 || align=center|
|-
|align="left"| || align="center"|C || align="left"|Montenegro || align="center"|2 || align="center"|– || 146 || 3,158 || 539 || 137 || 1,208 || 21.6 || 3.7 || 0.9 || 8.3 || align=center|
|-
|align="left"| || align="center"|G || align="left"|Washington || align="center"|1 || align="center"| || 12 || 99 || 6 || 16 || 34 || 8.3 || 0.5 || 1.3 || 2.8 || align=center|
|-
|align="left"| || align="center"|F || align="left"|LSU || align="center"|1 || align="center"| || 4 || 18 || 8 || 1 || 4 || 4.5 || 2.0 || 0.3 || 1.0 || align=center|
|-
|align="left" bgcolor="#FFCC00"|+ || align="center"|G/F || align="left"|Texas || align="center"|9 || align="center"|– || 641 || 24,208 || 4,518 || 2,363 || 17,566 || 37.8 || 7.0 || 3.7 || bgcolor="#CFECEC"|27.4 || align=center|
|-
|align="left"| || align="center"|G/F || align="left"|Washington State || align="center"|1 || align="center"| || 62 || 848 || 110 || 68 || 214 || 13.7 || 1.8 || 1.1 || 3.5 || align=center|
|-
|align="left" bgcolor="#FFCC00"|+ || align="center"|G/F || align="left"|Tennessee || align="center"|7 || align="center"|–– || 451 || 15,057 || 1,758 || 900 || 9,405 || 33.4 || 3.9 || 2.0 || 20.9 || align=center|
|-
|align="left"| || align="center"|F/C || align="left"|Louisville || align="center"|1 || align="center"| || 9 || 40 || 12 || 3 || 6 || 4.4 || 1.3 || 0.3 || 0.7 || align=center|
|-
|align="left"| || align="center"|C || align="left"|California || align="center"|1 || align="center"| || 22 || 279 || 65 || 8 || 66 || 12.7 || 3.0 || 0.4 || 3.0 || align=center|
|-
|align="left"| || align="center"|G || align="left"|Oklahoma State || align="center"|1 || align="center"| || 1 || 1 || 0 || 0 || 0 || 1.0 || 0.0 || 0.0 || 0.0 || align=center|
|-
|align="left"| || align="center"|F || align="left"|Iowa || align="center"|4 || align="center"|– || 262 || 5,314 || 1,865 || 148 || 1,058 || 20.3 || 7.1 || 0.6 || 4.0 || align=center|
|-
|align="left"| || align="center"|F || align="left"|Georgetown || align="center"|1 || align="center"| || 79 || 2,107 || 585 || 92 || 760 || 26.7 || 7.4 || 1.2 || 9.6 || align=center|
|}

F to G

|-
|align="left"| || align="center"|G || align="left"|USC || align="center"|1 || align="center"| || 8 || 32 || 1 || 9 || 13 || 4.0 || 0.1 || 1.1 || 1.6 || align=center|
|-
|align="left"| || align="center"|G || align="left"|Alabama || align="center"|1 || align="center"| || 38 || 400 || 43 || 25 || 243 || 10.5 || 1.1 || 0.7 || 6.4 || align=center|
|-
|align="left"| || align="center"|F || align="left"|Fresno State || align="center"|1 || align="center"| || 12 || 82 || 13 || 2 || 18 || 6.8 || 1.1 || 0.2 || 1.5 || align=center|
|-
|align="left"| || align="center"|G || align="left"|North Carolina || align="center"|2 || align="center"|– || 115 || 1,744 || 190 || 255 || 707 || 15.2 || 1.7 || 2.2 || 6.1 || align=center|
|-
|align="left" bgcolor="#CCFFCC"|x || align="center"|G/F || align="left"|Prime Prep Academy (TX) || align="center"|2 || align="center"|– || 135 || 2,694 || 188 || 91 || 702 || 20.0 || 1.4 || 0.7 || 5.2 || align=center|
|-
|align="left"| || align="center"|G || align="left"|Little Rock || align="center"|3 || align="center"|– || 125 || 2,181 || 173 || 161 || 621 || 17.4 || 1.4 || 1.3 || 5.0 || align=center|
|-
|align="left"| || align="center"|F || align="left"|Arizona || align="center"|1 || align="center"| || 20 || 97 || 30 || 7 || 40 || 4.9 || 1.5 || 0.4 || 2.0 || align=center|
|-
|align="left"| || align="center"|G || align="left"|Mississippi Valley State || align="center"|1 || align="center"| || 6 || 16 || 0 || 1 || 16 || 2.7 || 0.0 || 0.2 || 2.7 || align=center|
|-
|align="left"| || align="center"|G || align="left"|Maryland Eastern Shore || align="center"|2 || align="center"|– || 31 || 249 || 20 || 35 || 126 || 8.0 || 0.6 || 1.1 || 4.1 || align=center|
|-
|align="left"| || align="center"|F || align="left"|UIC || align="center"|1 || align="center"| || 28 || 139 || 24 || 5 || 90 || 5.0 || 0.9 || 0.2 || 3.2 || align=center|
|-
|align="left"| || align="center"|G || align="left"|North Carolina || align="center"|1 || align="center"| || 17 || 86 || 11 || 11 || 24 || 5.1 || 0.6 || 0.6 || 1.4 || align=center|
|-
|align="left"| || align="center"|F || align="left"|Cincinnati || align="center"|3 || align="center"|– || 99 || 1,481 || 469 || 11 || 590 || 15.0 || 4.7 || 0.1 || 6.0 || align=center|
|-
|align="left"| || align="center"|F/C || align="left"|UTEP || align="center"|1 || align="center"| || 60 || 718 || 107 || 41 || 203 || 12.0 || 1.8 || 0.7 || 3.4 || align=center|
|-
|align="left"| || align="center"|F/C || align="left"|South Carolina || align="center"|3 || align="center"|– || 227 || 6,384 || 2,032 || 540 || 2,407 || 28.1 || 9.0 || 2.4 || 10.6 || align=center|
|-
|align="left"| || align="center"|G || align="left"|Villanova || align="center"|1 || align="center"| || 27 || 572 || 51 || 49 || 151 || 21.2 || 1.9 || 1.8 || 5.6 || align=center|
|-
|align="left"| || align="center"|G || align="left"|Gonzaga || align="center"|1 || align="center"| || 54 || 469 || 56 || 24 || 183 || 8.7 || 1.0 || 0.4 || 3.4 || align=center|
|-
|align="left"| || align="center"|F || align="left"|France || align="center"|2 || align="center"|– || 109 || 1,704 || 231 || 89 || 489 || 15.6 || 2.1 || 0.8 || 4.5 || align=center|
|-
|align="left" bgcolor="#FFCC00"|+ || align="center"|F || align="left"|Fresno State || align="center"|2 || align="center"|– || 156 || 5,732 || 1,075 || 581 || 3,893 || 36.7 || 6.9 || 3.7 || 25.0 || align=center|
|-
|align="left"| || align="center"|G/F || align="left"|UTEP || align="center"|1 || align="center"| || 71 || 1,528 || 223 || 79 || 766 || 21.5 || 3.1 || 1.1 || 10.8 || align=center|
|-
|align="left"| || align="center"|F || align="left"|USC || align="center"|1 || align="center"| || 23 || 487 || 103 || 13 || 207 || 21.2 || 4.5 || 0.6 || 9.0 || align=center|
|-
|align="left"| || align="center"|G || align="left"|Weber State || align="center"|1 || align="center"| || 1 || 5 || 0 || 1 || 0 || 5.0 || 0.0 || 1.0 || 0.0 || align=center|
|-
|align="left"| || align="center"|G || align="left"|Illinois || align="center"|2 || align="center"|– || 152 || 4,560 || 558 || 467 || 2,113 || 30.0 || 3.7 || 3.1 || 13.9 || align=center|
|-
|align="left"| || align="center"|G/F || align="left"|Purdue || align="center"|1 || align="center"| || 81 || 1,644 || 220 || 202 || 688 || 20.3 || 2.7 || 2.5 || 8.5 || align=center|
|-
|align="left"| || align="center"|C || align="left"|Greece || align="center"|1 || align="center"| || 13 || 81 || 8 || 1 || 17 || 6.2 || 0.6 || 0.1 || 1.3 || align=center|
|-
|align="left"| || align="center"|F || align="left"|Providence || align="center"|1 || align="center"| || 5 || 34 || 4 || 1 || 6 || 6.8 || 0.8 || 0.2 || 1.2 || align=center|
|-
|align="left"| || align="center"|G || align="left"|Indiana || align="center"|1 || align="center"| || 28 || 197 || 13 || 11 || 93 || 7.0 || 0.5 || 0.4 || 3.3 || align=center|
|-
|align="left"| || align="center"|F/C || align="left"|Clemson || align="center"|1 || align="center"| || 76 || 2,688 || 591 || 188 || 612 || 35.4 || 7.8 || 2.5 || 8.1 || align=center|
|-
|align="left"| || align="center"|F || align="left"|Syracuse || align="center"|3 || align="center"|– || 239 || 5,749 || 935 || 182 || 2,193 || 24.1 || 3.9 || 0.8 || 9.2 || align=center|
|-
|align="left"| || align="center"|F || align="left"|Clemson || align="center"|1 || align="center"| || 3 || 2 || 0 || 0 || 0 || 0.7 || 0.0 || 0.0 || 0.0 || align=center|
|-
|align="left"| || align="center"|F || align="left"|Long Beach State || align="center"|3 || align="center"|– || 166 || 5,062 || 983 || 421 || 2,061 || 30.5 || 5.9 || 2.5 || 12.4 || align=center|
|-
|align="left"| || align="center"|F || align="left"|Georgetown || align="center"|4 || align="center"|– || 289 || 9,984 || 1,662 || 497 || 4,111 || 34.5 || 5.8 || 1.7 || 14.2 || align=center|
|-
|align="left"| || align="center"|F/C || align="left"|Louisiana Tech || align="center"|2 || align="center"|– || 85 || 2,178 || 558 || 130 || 853 || 25.6 || 6.6 || 1.5 || 10.0 || align=center|
|-
|align="left"| || align="center"|F || align="left"|Oregon || align="center"|1 || align="center"| || 9 || 26 || 6 || 0 || 19 || 2.9 || 0.7 || 0.0 || 2.1 || align=center|
|-
|align="left"| || align="center"|G/F || align="left"|Seton Hall || align="center"|1 || align="center"| || 13 || 85 || 22 || 5 || 14 || 6.5 || 1.7 || 0.4 || 1.1 || align=center|
|}

H

|-
|align="left"| || align="center"|G || align="left"|Bowling Green || align="center"|2 || align="center"|– || 42 || 294 || 41 || 44 || 91 || 7.0 || 1.0 || 1.0 || 2.2 || align=center|
|-
|align="left"| || align="center"|G/F || align="left"|UConn || align="center"|1 || align="center"| || 6 || 28 || 5 || 8 || 12 || 4.7 || 0.8 || 1.3 || 2.0 || align=center|
|-
|align="left"| || align="center"|C || align="left"|Washington || align="center"|1 || align="center"| || 15 || 205 || 59 || 14 || 76 || 13.7 || 3.9 || 0.9 || 5.1 || align=center|
|-
|align="left"| || align="center"|G/F || align="left"|Notre Dame || align="center"|2 || align="center"|– || 155 || 3,233 || 419 || 294 || 868 || 20.9 || 2.7 || 1.9 || 5.6 || align=center|
|-
|align="left"| || align="center"|G || align="left"|Arizona State || align="center"|3 || align="center"|– || 220 || 5,873 || 751 || 542 || 2,795 || 26.7 || 3.4 || 2.5 || 12.7 || align=center|
|-
|align="left"| || align="center"|G || align="left"|Stanford || align="center"|2 || align="center"|– || 85 || 2,734 || 320 || 278 || 1,053 || 32.2 || 3.8 || 3.3 || 12.4 || align=center|
|-
|align="left"| || align="center"|F/C || align="left"|Pfeiffer || align="center"|2 || align="center"| || 11 || 73 || 19 || 6 || 24 || 6.6 || 1.7 || 0.5 || 2.2 || align=center|
|-
|align="left"| || align="center"|G || align="left"|Providence || align="center"|2 || align="center"|– || 103 || 867 || 81 || 83 || 415 || 8.4 || 0.8 || 0.8 || 4.0 || align=center|
|-
|align="left"| || align="center"|F/C || align="left"|Washington || align="center"|2 || align="center"|– || 110 || 1,709 || 353 || 135 || 460 || 15.5 || 3.2 || 1.2 || 4.2 || align=center|
|-
|align="left"| || align="center"|G || align="left"|Bradley || align="center"|4 || align="center"|– || 296 || 9,819 || 1,152 || 812 || 3,798 || 33.2 || 3.9 || 2.7 || 12.8 || align=center|
|-
|align="left"| || align="center"|C || align="left"|Idaho State || align="center"|1 || align="center"| || 43 || 253 || 62 || 13 || 57 || 5.9 || 1.4 || 0.3 || 1.3 || align=center|
|-
|align="left"| || align="center"|F || align="left"|Marquette || align="center"|1 || align="center"| || 26 || 141 || 16 || 4 || 37 || 5.4 || 0.6 || 0.2 || 1.4 || align=center|
|-
|align="left" bgcolor="#FFFF99"|^ (#24) || align="center"|F/C || align="left"|Detroit Mercy || align="center"|5 || align="center"|– || 326 || 13,156 || 3,954 || 769 || 8,131 || bgcolor="#CFECEC"|40.4 || 12.1 || 2.4 || 24.9 || align=center|
|-
|align="left" bgcolor="#FFCC00"|+ || align="center"|G || align="left"|UCLA || align="center"|2 || align="center"| || 128 || 3,237 || 389 || 615 || 2,080 || 25.3 || 3.0 || 4.8 || 16.3 || align=center|
|-
|align="left"| || align="center"|F || align="left"|Oklahoma || align="center"|3 || align="center"|– || 126 || 2,543 || 776 || 102 || 854 || 20.2 || 6.2 || 0.8 || 6.8 || align=center|
|-
|align="left"| || align="center"|G || align="left"|VCU || align="center"|3 || align="center"|– || 167 || 5,371 || 386 || 1,078 || 2,200 || 32.2 || 2.3 || 6.5 || 13.2 || align=center|
|-
|align="left"| || align="center"|F || align="left"|Fresno State || align="center"|1 || align="center"| || 12 || 94 || 12 || 6 || 22 || 7.8 || 1.0 || 0.5 || 1.8 || align=center|
|-
|align="left"| || align="center"|G || align="left"|Princeton || align="center"|2 || align="center"|– || 72 || 1,357 || 133 || 199 || 310 || 18.8 || 1.8 || 2.8 || 4.3 || align=center|
|-
|align="left"| || align="center"|C || align="left"|Arkansas || align="center"|1 || align="center"| || 1 || 2 || 3 || 0 || 2 || 2.0 || 3.0 || 0.0 || 2.0 || align=center|
|-
|align="left"| || align="center"|F || align="left"|Oklahoma State || align="center"|1 || align="center"| || 39 || 258 || 55 || 6 || 132 || 6.6 || 1.4 || 0.2 || 3.4 || align=center|
|-
|align="left"| || align="center"|F || align="left"|DePaul || align="center"|1 || align="center"| || 13 || 53 || 12 || 3 || 25 || 4.1 || 0.9 || 0.2 || 1.9 || align=center|
|-
|align="left"| || align="center"|F || align="left"|Stanford || align="center"|3 || align="center"|– || 76 || 1,068 || 180 || 23 || 187 || 14.1 || 2.4 || 0.3 || 2.5 || align=center|
|-
|align="left"| || align="center"|F/C || align="left"|Princeton || align="center"|3 || align="center"|– || 107 || 1,865 || 427 || 157 || 464 || 17.4 || 4.0 || 1.5 || 4.3 || align=center|
|}

I to J

|-
|align="left"| || align="center"|F/C || align="left"|Congo || align="center"|7 || align="center"|– || 524 || 15,099 || 3,875 || 309 || 6,054 || 28.8 || 7.4 || 0.6 || 11.6 || align=center|
|-
|align="left"| || align="center"|F || align="left"|Turkey || align="center"|1 || align="center"| || 3 || 62 || 16 || 1 || 15 || 20.7 || 5.3 || 0.3 || 5.0 || align=center|
|-
|align="left"| || align="center"|G || align="left"|Texas || align="center"|3 || align="center"|– || 61 || 514 || 41 || 17 || 112 || 8.4 || 0.7 || 0.3 || 1.8 || align=center|
|-
|align="left"| || align="center"|G || align="left"|Boston College || align="center"|4 || align="center"|– || 245 || 5,169 || 733 || 738 || 2,202 || 21.1 || 3.0 || 3.0 || 9.0 || align=center|
|-
|align="left"| || align="center"|F || align="left"|Ohio State || align="center"|1 || align="center"| || 56 || 939 || 133 || 30 || 243 || 16.8 || 2.4 || 0.5 || 4.3 || align=center|
|-
|align="left"| || align="center"|C || align="left"|Florida A&M || align="center"|4 || align="center"|– || 252 || 4,035 || 919 || 102 || 1,293 || 16.0 || 3.6 || 0.4 || 5.1 || align=center|
|-
|align="left"| || align="center"|F || align="left"|Arizona || align="center"|1 || align="center"| || 5 || 25 || 4 || 1 || 7 || 5.0 || 0.8 || 0.2 || 1.4 || align=center|
|-
|align="left"| || align="center"|G || align="left"|Southern || align="center"|2 || align="center"|– || 96 || 866 || 67 || 235 || 208 || 9.0 || 0.7 || 2.4 || 2.2 || align=center|
|-
|align="left"| || align="center"|G || align="left"|Missouri || align="center"|1 || align="center"| || 25 || 176 || 12 || 14 || 55 || 7.0 || 0.5 || 0.6 || 2.2 || align=center|
|-
|align="left"| || align="center"|F/C || align="left"|Florida A&M || align="center"|2 || align="center"|– || 152 || 1,774 || 451 || 38 || 366 || 11.7 || 3.0 || 0.3 || 2.4 || align=center|
|-
|align="left"| || align="center"|C || align="left"|Kentucky || align="center"|1 || align="center"| || 31 || 161 || 34 || 8 || 55 || 5.2 || 1.1 || 0.3 || 1.8 || align=center|
|-
|align="left" bgcolor="#FFFF99"|^ || align="center"|G || align="left"|Pepperdine || align="center"|4 || align="center"|– || 323 || 9,530 || 1,384 || 965 || 4,590 || 29.5 || 4.3 || 3.0 || 14.2 || align=center|
|-
|align="left"| || align="center"|G || align="left"|Auburn || align="center"|1 || align="center"| || 24 || 508 || 46 || 115 || 217 || 21.2 || 1.9 || 4.8 || 9.0 || align=center|
|-
|align="left"| || align="center"|G/F || align="left"|Illinois || align="center"|3 || align="center"|– || 229 || 6,008 || 789 || 390 || 3,714 || 26.2 || 3.4 || 1.7 || 16.2 || align=center|
|-
|align="left"| || align="center"|C || align="left"|New Orleans || align="center"|3 || align="center"|– || 190 || 2,706 || 840 || 71 || 762 || 14.2 || 4.4 || 0.4 || 4.0 || align=center|
|-
|align="left"| || align="center"|F/C || align="left"|Dillard || align="center"|1 || align="center"| || 41 || 264 || 60 || 13 || 35 || 6.4 || 1.5 || 0.3 || 0.9 || align=center|
|-
|align="left"| || align="center"|F || align="left"|Iowa || align="center"|5 || align="center"|– || 333 || 9,242 || 1,525 || 1,333 || 3,608 || 27.8 || 4.6 || 4.0 || 10.8 || align=center|
|-
|align="left"| || align="center"|F/C || align="left"|Oregon State || align="center"|1 || align="center"| || 21 || 242 || 50 || 16 || 117 || 11.5 || 2.4 || 0.8 || 5.6 || align=center|
|-
|align="left"| || align="center"|G || align="left"|Baylor || align="center"|3 || align="center"|– || 126 || 2,740 || 436 || 406 || 1,201 || 21.7 || 3.5 || 3.2 || 9.5 || align=center|
|-
|align="left"| || align="center"|F || align="left"|Baylor || align="center"|3 || align="center"|– || 143 || 1,675 || 252 || 54 || 488 || 11.7 || 1.8 || 0.4 || 3.4 || align=center|
|}

K to L

|-
|align="left"| || align="center"|C || align="left"|Turkey || align="center"|3 || align="center"|– || 180 || 4,063 || 1,433 || 129 || 2,556 || 22.6 || 8.0 || 0.7 || 14.2 || align=center|
|-
|align="left"| || align="center"|F/C || align="left"|Guilford || align="center"|1 || align="center"| || 82 || 1,660 || 484 || 83 || 641 || 20.2 || 5.9 || 1.0 || 7.8 || align=center|
|-
|align="left"| || align="center"|F || align="left"|Michigan State || align="center"|2 || align="center"|– || 129 || 2,065 || 557 || 142 || 907 || 16.0 || 4.3 || 1.1 || 7.0 || align=center|
|-
|align="left" bgcolor="#FFCC00"|+ || align="center"|F/C || align="left"|Concord HS (IN) || align="center"|8 || align="center"|– || 625 || 18,609 || 5,978 || 1,096 || 10,148 || 29.8 || 9.6 || 1.8 || 16.2 || align=center|
|-
|align="left"| || align="center"|F || align="left"|Duke || align="center"|2 || align="center"|– || 86 || 1,323 || 261 || 67 || 454 || 15.4 || 3.0 || 0.8 || 5.3 || align=center|
|-
|align="left"| || align="center"|F || align="left"|Longwood || align="center"|1 || align="center"| || 37 || 717 || 135 || 44 || 234 || 19.4 || 3.6 || 1.2 || 6.3 || align=center|
|-
|align="left"| || align="center"|F || align="left"|Wake Forest || align="center"|1 || align="center"| || 15 || 86 || 15 || 11 || 55 || 5.7 || 1.0 || 0.7 || 3.7 || align=center|
|-
|align="left"| || align="center"|F || align="left"|Alabama || align="center"|2 || align="center"|– || 137 || 2,946 || 592 || 232 || 769 || 21.5 || 4.3 || 1.7 || 5.6 || align=center|
|-
|align="left"| || align="center"|C || align="left"|Nebraska || align="center"|4 || align="center"|– || 72 || 309 || 74 || 21 || 135 || 4.3 || 1.0 || 0.3 || 1.9 || align=center|
|-
|align="left"| || align="center"|F || align="left"|South Florida || align="center"|1 || align="center"| || 6 || 31 || 9 || 1 || 9 || 5.2 || 1.5 || 0.2 || 1.5 || align=center|
|-
|align="left"| || align="center"|G || align="left"|Nebraska-Kearney || align="center"|1 || align="center"| || 44 || 239 || 26 || 51 || 66 || 5.4 || 0.6 || 1.2 || 1.5 || align=center|
|-
|align="left"| || align="center"|F || align="left"|Marquette || align="center"|2 || align="center"|– || 152 || 4,000 || 770 || 212 || 1,989 || 26.3 || 5.1 || 1.4 || 13.1 || align=center|
|-
|align="left"| || align="center"|G || align="left"|Kentucky || align="center"|2 || align="center"|– || 152 || 2,918 || 567 || 472 || 1,126 || 19.2 || 3.7 || 3.1 || 7.4 || align=center|
|-
|align="left"| || align="center"|C || align="left"|Serbia || align="center"|3 || align="center"|– || 169 || 3,900 || 843 || 100 || 1,441 || 23.1 || 5.0 || 0.6 || 8.5 || align=center|
|-
|align="left"| || align="center"|G || align="left"|Turkey || align="center"|1 || align="center"| || 5 || 12 || 1 || 0 || 0 || 2.4 || 0.2 || 0.0 || 0.0 || align=center|
|-
|align="left"| || align="center"|F/C || align="left"|North Carolina || align="center"|2 || align="center"|– || 105 || 1,739 || 502 || 123 || 635 || 16.6 || 4.8 || 1.2 || 6.0 || align=center|
|-
|align="left"| || align="center"|G/F || align="left"|UConn || align="center"|3 || align="center"|– || 148 || 2,318 || 314 || 164 || 1,031 || 15.7 || 2.1 || 1.1 || 7.0 || align=center|
|-
|align="left"| || align="center"|F/C || align="left"|France || align="center"|1 || align="center"| || 50 || 739 || 183 || 51 || 286 || 14.8 || 3.7 || 1.0 || 5.7 || align=center|
|-
|align="left" bgcolor="#FFCC00"|+ || align="center"|F || align="left"|Alief Elsik HS (TX) || align="center"|9 || align="center"|– || 617 || 20,921 || 3,595 || 1,051 || 10,251 || 33.9 || 5.8 || 1.7 || 16.6 || align=center|
|-
|align="left"| || align="center"|G || align="left"|Kentucky || align="center"|1 || align="center"| || 39 || 290 || 53 || 15 || 58 || 7.4 || 1.4 || 0.4 || 1.5 || align=center|
|-
|align="left"| || align="center"|F/C || align="left"|Arizona State || align="center"|3 || align="center"|– || 239 || 5,906 || 1,877 || 222 || 1,989 || 24.7 || 7.9 || 0.9 || 8.3 || align=center|
|-
|align="left"| || align="center"|G || align="left"|LSU || align="center"|2 || align="center"| || 17 || 202 || 26 || 30 || 41 || 11.9 || 1.5 || 1.8 || 2.4 || align=center|
|-
|align="left"| || align="center"|G || align="left"|Peoria HS (IL) || align="center"|2 || align="center"|– || 18 || 320 || 46 || 30 || 72 || 17.8 || 2.6 || 1.7 || 4.0 || align=center|
|-
|align="left"| || align="center"|F || align="left"|Cincinnati || align="center"|1 || align="center"| || 63 || 989 || 251 || 41 || 285 || 15.7 || 4.0 || 0.7 || 4.5 || align=center|
|-
|align="left"| || align="center"|G/F || align="left"|Seattle || align="center"|2 || align="center"|– || 67 || 638 || 123 || 43 || 147 || 9.5 || 1.8 || 0.6 || 2.2 || align=center|
|-
|align="left"| || align="center"|F || align="left"|Southern || align="center"|1 || align="center"| || 32 || 450 || 87 || 21 || 131 || 14.1 || 2.7 || 0.7 || 4.1 || align=center|
|-
|align="left"| || align="center"|G || align="left"|Maryland || align="center"|1 || align="center"| || 74 || 842 || 79 || 260 || 310 || 11.4 || 1.1 || 3.5 || 4.2 || align=center|
|-
|align="left"| || align="center"|F/C || align="left"|Marquette || align="center"|1 || align="center"| || 63 || 1,120 || 307 || 65 || 500 || 17.8 || 4.9 || 1.0 || 7.9 || align=center|
|-
|align="left"| || align="center"|F || align="left"|France || align="center"|1 || align="center"| || 21 || 123 || 18 || 4 || 35 || 5.9 || 0.9 || 0.2 || 1.7 || align=center|
|}

M

|-
|align="left"| || align="center"|F || align="left"|UCLA || align="center"|1 || align="center"| || 17 || 365 || 65 || 16 || 185 || 21.5 || 3.8 || 0.9 || 10.9 || align=center|
|-
|align="left" bgcolor="#FFFF99"|^ || align="center"|G || align="left"|Soviet Union || align="center"|1 || align="center"| || 66 || 1,194 || 68 || 110 || 612 || 18.1 || 1.0 || 1.7 || 9.3 || align=center|
|-
|align="left"| || align="center"|F || align="left"|UConn || align="center"|1 || align="center"| || 15 || 184 || 46 || 5 || 57 || 12.3 || 3.1 || 0.3 || 3.8 || align=center|
|-
|align="left"| || align="center"|F || align="left"|Oklahoma || align="center"|1 || align="center"| || 13 || 174 || 37 || 4 || 17 || 13.4 || 2.8 || 0.3 || 1.3 || align=center|
|-
|align="left"| || align="center"|F || align="left"|Kansas || align="center"|1 || align="center"| || 3 || 7 || 4 || 0 || 2 || 2.3 || 1.3 || 0.0 || 0.7 || align=center|
|-
|align="left"| || align="center"|G || align="left"|Western Carolina || align="center"|1 || align="center"| || 77 || 2,136 || 178 || 106 || 1,077 || 27.7 || 2.3 || 1.4 || 14.0 || align=center|
|-
|align="left"| || align="center"|F || align="left"|Oklahoma State || align="center"|4 || align="center"|– || 244 || 6,817 || 1,092 || 308 || 2,420 || 27.9 || 4.5 || 1.3 || 9.9 || align=center|
|-
|align="left"| || align="center"|G || align="left"|Florida || align="center"|1 || align="center"| || 47 || 989 || 79 || 75 || 513 || 21.0 || 1.7 || 1.6 || 10.9 || align=center|
|-
|align="left"| || align="center"|G || align="left"|VCU || align="center"|4 || align="center"|– || 183 || 2,634 || 243 || 518 || 738 || 14.4 || 1.3 || 2.8 || 4.0 || align=center|
|-
|align="left"| || align="center"|C || align="left"|Michigan || align="center"|2 || align="center"|– || 155 || 3,289 || 801 || 161 || 1,407 || 21.2 || 5.2 || 1.0 || 9.1 || align=center|
|-
|align="left"| || align="center"|C || align="left"|UCLA || align="center"|3 || align="center"|– || 154 || 2,220 || 509 || 85 || 699 || 14.4 || 3.3 || 0.6 || 4.5 || align=center|
|-
|align="left"| || align="center"|G/F || align="left"|Louisville || align="center"|2 || align="center"|– || 53 || 613 || 132 || 51 || 144 || 11.6 || 2.5 || 1.0 || 2.7 || align=center|
|-
|align="left" bgcolor="#FFCC00"|+ || align="center"|F || align="left"|Wichita State || align="center"|6 || align="center"|– || 408 || 13,786 || 2,839 || 1,006 || 8,438 || 33.8 || 7.0 || 2.5 || 20.7 || align=center|
|-
|align="left"| || align="center"|F/C || align="left"|Western Kentucky || align="center"|3 || align="center"|– || 107 || 1,769 || 555 || 111 || 640 || 16.5 || 5.2 || 1.0 || 6.0 || align=center|
|-
|align="left"| || align="center"|F || align="left"|Creighton || align="center"|1 || align="center"| || 22 || 430 || 49 || 13 || 145 || 19.5 || 2.2 || 0.6 || 6.6 || align=center|
|-
|align="left"| || align="center"|F/C || align="left"|Michigan || align="center"|2 || align="center"|– || 52 || 557 || 183 || 17 || 227 || 10.7 || 3.5 || 0.3 || 4.4 || align=center|
|-
|align="left"| || align="center"|C || align="left"|Marquette || align="center"|2 || align="center"|– || 160 || 2,688 || 589 || 42 || 561 || 16.8 || 3.7 || 0.3 || 3.5 || align=center|
|-
|align="left"| || align="center"|F || align="left"|Eastern Michigan || align="center"|3 || align="center"|– || 131 || 3,262 || 598 || 154 || 783 || 24.9 || 4.6 || 1.2 || 6.0 || align=center|
|-
|align="left"| || align="center"|F/C || align="left"|Alabama || align="center"|6 || align="center"|– || 446 || 13,957 || 2,299 || 999 || 6,179 || 31.3 || 5.2 || 2.2 || 13.9 || align=center|
|-
|align="left"| (#10) || align="center"|G/F || align="left"|NC State || align="center"|12 || align="center"|– || 796 || 20,462 || 3,222 || 4,893 || 4,733 || 25.7 || 4.0 || 6.1 || 5.9 || align=center|
|-
|align="left"| || align="center"|F || align="left"|Illinois || align="center"|2 || align="center"|– || 39 || 201 || 40 || 15 || 72 || 5.2 || 1.0 || 0.4 || 1.8 || align=center|
|-
|align="left"| || align="center"|F || align="left"|Saint Mary's || align="center"|4 || align="center"|– || 323 || 9,646 || 2,813 || 652 || 4,050 || 29.9 || 8.7 || 2.0 || 12.5 || align=center|
|-
|align="left"| || align="center"|C || align="left"|Kentucky || align="center"|3 || align="center"|– || 92 || 1,140 || 290 || 20 || 344 || 12.4 || 3.2 || 0.2 || 3.7 || align=center|
|-
|align="left"| || align="center"|F/C || align="left"|Nebraska || align="center"|1 || align="center"| || 47 || 583 || 130 || 27 || 154 || 12.4 || 2.8 || 0.6 || 3.3 || align=center|
|-
|align="left"| || align="center"|F || align="left"|Kansas || align="center"|1 || align="center"| || 24 || 387 || 91 || 19 || 156 || 16.1 || 3.8 || 0.8 || 6.5 || align=center|
|-
|align="left"| || align="center"|G || align="left"|Georgia Tech || align="center"|3 || align="center"|– || 182 || 3,359 || 286 || 103 || 1,400 || 18.5 || 1.6 || 0.6 || 7.7 || align=center|
|-
|align="left"| || align="center"|F/C || align="left"|San Francisco || align="center"|2 || align="center"|– || 30 || 552 || 118 || 68 || 211 || 18.4 || 3.9 || 2.3 || 7.0 || align=center|
|-
|align="left"| || align="center"|C || align="left"|Ohio State || align="center"|2 || align="center"|– || 26 || 139 || 34 || 1 || 39 || 5.3 || 1.3 || 0.0 || 1.5 || align=center|
|-
|align="left"| || align="center"|G || align="left"|Shaw || align="center"|4 || align="center"|– || 181 || 4,009 || 391 || 392 || 1,836 || 22.1 || 2.2 || 2.2 || 10.1 || align=center|
|-
|align="left"| || align="center"|F/C || align="left"|Detroit Mercy || align="center"|3 || align="center"|– || 200 || 3,038 || 1,106 || 165 || 1,244 || 15.2 || 5.5 || 0.8 || 6.2 || align=center|
|}

N to P

|-
|align="left" bgcolor="#CCFFCC"|x || align="center"|F || align="left"|Iowa State || align="center"|1 || align="center"| || 61 || 694 || 116 || 20 || 241 || 11.4 || 1.9 || 0.3 || 4.0 || align=center|
|-
|align="left"| || align="center"|F || align="left"|Miami (OH) || align="center"|1 || align="center"| || 2 || 17 || 0 || 1 || 4 || 8.5 || 0.0 || 0.5 || 2.0 || align=center|
|-
|align="left" bgcolor="#CCFFCC"|x || align="center"|F/C || align="left"|Kentucky || align="center"|1 || align="center"| || 77 || 1,055 || 325 || 45 || 378 || 13.7 || 4.2 || 0.6 || 4.9 || align=center|
|-
|align="left"| || align="center"|G || align="left"|West Florida || align="center"|1 || align="center"| || 12 || 140 || 20 || 24 || 38 || 11.7 || 1.7 || 2.0 || 3.2 || align=center|
|-
|align="left"| || align="center"|F || align="left"|Alcorn State || align="center"|2 || align="center"|– || 140 || 2,651 || 521 || 158 || 1,027 || 18.9 || 3.7 || 1.1 || 7.3 || align=center|
|-
|align="left"| || align="center"|F || align="left"|Marquette || align="center"|2 || align="center"|– || 20 || 112 || 10 || 5 || 32 || 5.6 || 0.5 || 0.3 || 1.6 || align=center|
|-
|align="left"| || align="center"|G || align="left"|Indiana || align="center"|1 || align="center"| || 67 || 2,222 || 291 || 176 || 1,067 || 33.2 || 4.3 || 2.6 || 15.9 || align=center|
|-
|align="left"| || align="center"|G || align="left"|Seattle || align="center"|2 || align="center"|– || 102 || 1,166 || 90 || 113 || 508 || 11.4 || 0.9 || 1.1 || 5.0 || align=center|
|-
|align="left"| || align="center"|G || align="left"|UConn || align="center"|2 || align="center"| || 54 || 1,033 || 108 || 130 || 275 || 19.1 || 2.0 || 2.4 || 5.1 || align=center|
|-
|align="left"| || align="center"|F/C || align="left"|Louisville || align="center"|1 || align="center"| || 73 || 897 || 204 || 75 || 277 || 12.3 || 2.8 || 1.0 || 3.8 || align=center|
|-
|align="left"| || align="center"|F/C || align="left"|Kentucky || align="center"|1 || align="center"| || 13 || 104 || 26 || 4 || 33 || 8.0 || 2.0 || 0.3 || 2.5 || align=center|
|-
|align="left"| || align="center"|G/F || align="left"|Syracuse || align="center"|1 || align="center"| || 21 || 451 || 80 || 38 || 163 || 21.5 || 3.8 || 1.8 || 7.8 || align=center|
|-
|align="left"| || align="center"|C || align="left"|Nigeria || align="center"|2 || align="center"|– || 66 || 442 || 146 || 6 || 100 || 6.7 || 2.2 || 0.1 || 1.5 || align=center|
|-
|align="left"| || align="center"|G/F || align="left"|UNLV || align="center"|1 || align="center"| || 41 || 307 || 50 || 33 || 158 || 7.5 || 1.2 || 0.8 || 3.9 || align=center|
|-
|align="left"| || align="center"|F || align="left"|Kentucky || align="center"|2 || align="center"|– || 145 || 2,131 || 340 || 88 || 547 || 14.7 || 2.3 || 0.6 || 3.8 || align=center|
|-
|align="left"| || align="center"|F || align="left"|Cincinnati || align="center"|2 || align="center"|– || 157 || 4,156 || 816 || 287 || 1,930 || 26.5 || 5.2 || 1.8 || 12.3 || align=center|
|-
|align="left"| || align="center"|G || align="left"|Murray State || align="center"|2 || align="center"|– || 77 || 1,018 || 116 || 148 || 389 || 13.2 || 1.5 || 1.9 || 5.1 || align=center|
|-
|align="left" bgcolor="#FFFF99"|^ || align="center"|G || align="left"|Oregon State || align="center"|13 || align="center"|– || bgcolor="#CFECEC"|999 || bgcolor="#CFECEC"|36,858 || 4,240 || bgcolor="#CFECEC"|7,384 || 18,207 || 36.9 || 4.2 || 7.4 || 18.2 || align=center|
|-
|align="left"| || align="center"|C || align="left"|Beaumont HS (TX) || align="center"|5 || align="center"|– || 273 || 6,315 || 1,611 || 315 || 1,159 || 23.1 || 5.9 || 1.2 || 4.2 || align=center|
|-
|align="left"| || align="center"|F/C || align="left"|North Carolina || align="center"|6 || align="center"|– || 437 || 11,108 || 1,831 || 610 || 4,844 || 25.4 || 4.2 || 1.4 || 11.1 || align=center|
|-
|align="left"| || align="center"|F || align="left"|Auburn || align="center"|1 || align="center"| || 37 || 340 || 53 || 22 || 102 || 9.2 || 1.4 || 0.6 || 2.8 || align=center|
|-
|align="left"| || align="center"|F || align="left"|Michigan State || align="center"|1 || align="center"| || 4 || 23 || 3 || 1 || 4 || 5.8 || 0.8 || 0.3 || 1.0 || align=center|
|-
|align="left"| || align="center"|C || align="left"|France || align="center"|4 || align="center"|– || 243 || 4,444 || 1,096 || 98 || 1,389 || 18.3 || 4.5 || 0.4 || 5.7 || align=center|
|-
|align="left"| || align="center"|G || align="left"|Alcorn State || align="center"|2 || align="center"|– || 130 || 1,349 || 139 || 135 || 461 || 10.4 || 1.1 || 1.0 || 3.5 || align=center|
|-
|align="left"| || align="center"|G || align="left"|Rice || align="center"|4 || align="center"|– || 238 || 6,738 || 582 || 624 || 4,393 || 28.3 || 2.4 || 2.6 || 18.5 || align=center|
|-
|align="left"| || align="center"|F/C || align="left"|Virginia || align="center"|5 || align="center"|– || 337 || 5,441 || 1,531 || 128 || 1,695 || 16.1 || 4.5 || 0.4 || 5.0 || align=center|
|-
|align="left"| || align="center"|F || align="left"|Norfolk State || align="center"|1 || align="center"| || 11 || 74 || 11 || 4 || 21 || 6.7 || 1.0 || 0.4 || 1.9 || align=center|
|-
|align="left"| || align="center"|C || align="left"|Wright State || align="center"|4 || align="center"|– || 148 || 2,478 || 518 || 73 || 754 || 16.7 || 3.5 || 0.5 || 5.1 || align=center|
|}

R to S

|-
|align="left"| || align="center"|G || align="left"|Oregon State || align="center"|2 || align="center"|– || 97 || 808 || 76 || 161 || 347 || 8.3 || 0.8 || 1.7 || 3.6 || align=center|
|-
|align="left"| || align="center"|F || align="left"|Serbia || align="center"|5 || align="center"|– || 320 || 8,406 || 1,435 || 478 || 3,232 || 26.3 || 4.5 || 1.5 || 10.1 || align=center|
|-
|align="left"| || align="center"|F || align="left"|Florida State || align="center"|1 || align="center"| || 5 || 17 || 2 || 0 || 8 || 3.4 || 0.4 || 0.0 || 1.6 || align=center|
|-
|align="left"| || align="center"|G/F || align="left"|LSU || align="center"|1 || align="center"| || 56 || 737 || 100 || 62 || 428 || 13.2 || 1.8 || 1.1 || 7.6 || align=center|
|-
|align="left"| || align="center"|G || align="left"|Oregon || align="center"|5 || align="center"|– || 362 || 9,624 || 805 || 1,805 || 3,288 || 26.6 || 2.2 || 5.0 || 9.1 || align=center|
|-
|align="left" bgcolor="#CCFFCC"|x || align="center"|G/F || align="left"|Colorado || align="center"|5 || align="center"|– || 295 || 6,651 || 1,188 || 257 || 1,356 || 22.5 || 4.0 || 0.9 || 4.6 || align=center|
|-
|align="left"| || align="center"|F || align="left"|UNLV || align="center"|1 || align="center"| || 12 || 105 || 19 || 13 || 46 || 8.8 || 1.6 || 1.1 || 3.8 || align=center|
|-
|align="left"| || align="center"|G || align="left"|Washington || align="center"|1 || align="center"| || 4 || 30 || 1 || 6 || 13 || 7.5 || 0.3 || 1.5 || 3.3 || align=center|
|-
|align="left"| || align="center"|F || align="left"|Drexel || align="center"|1 || align="center"| || 20 || 310 || 65 || 26 || 100 || 15.5 || 3.3 || 1.3 || 5.0 || align=center|
|-
|align="left" bgcolor="#FFCC00"|+ || align="center"|F/C || align="left"|Colorado State || align="center"|5 || align="center"|– || 264 || 8,872 || 2,643 || 397 || 5,646 || 33.6 || 10.0 || 1.5 || 21.4 || align=center|
|-
|align="left"| || align="center"|F/C || align="left"|Gonzaga || align="center"|1 || align="center"| || 81 || 1,632 || 288 || 82 || 479 || 20.1 || 3.6 || 1.0 || 5.9 || align=center|
|-
|align="left"| || align="center"|F/C || align="left"|Purdue || align="center"|5 || align="center"|– || 124 || 630 || 121 || 17 || 251 || 5.1 || 1.0 || 0.1 || 2.0 || align=center|
|-
|align="left"| || align="center"|F/C || align="left"|Chattanooga || align="center"|3 || align="center"|– || 213 || 2,326 || 480 || 116 || 1,015 || 10.9 || 2.3 || 0.5 || 4.8 || align=center|
|-
|align="left" bgcolor="#FFCC00"|+ || align="center"|F/C || align="left"|Washington || align="center"|6 || align="center"|– || 415 || 14,513 || 2,608 || 1,652 || 6,870 || 35.0 || 6.3 || 4.0 || 16.6 || align=center|
|-
|align="left" bgcolor="#CCFFCC"|x || align="center"|G || align="left"|Germany || align="center"|1 || align="center"| || 79 || 2,314 || 284 || 323 || 1,224 || 29.3 || 3.6 || 4.1 || 15.5 || align=center|
|-
|align="left"| || align="center"|G || align="left"|Richmond || align="center"|1 || align="center"| || 19 || 110 || 21 || 18 || 57 || 5.8 || 1.1 || 0.9 || 3.0 || align=center|
|-
|align="left"| || align="center"|F || align="left"|Xavier (LS) || align="center"|3 || align="center"|– || 235 || 5,734 || 1,087 || 293 || 2,422 || 24.4 || 4.6 || 1.2 || 10.3 || align=center|
|-
|align="left"| || align="center"|G/F || align="left"|Switzerland || align="center"|6 || align="center"|– || 368 || 9,842 || 1,517 || 568 || 2,284 || 26.7 || 4.1 || 1.5 || 6.2 || align=center|
|-
|align="left"| || align="center"|F/C || align="left"|Ohio State || align="center"|1 || align="center"| || 45 || 587 || 70 || 32 || 217 || 13.0 || 1.6 || 0.7 || 4.8 || align=center|
|-
|align="left"| || align="center"|F/C || align="left"|Senegal || align="center"|3 || align="center"|– || 46 || 254 || 70 || 1 || 100 || 5.5 || 1.5 || 0.0 || 2.2 || align=center|
|-
|align="left"| || align="center"|F || align="left"|Ole Miss || align="center"|3 || align="center"|– || 111 || 1,173 || 185 || 50 || 352 || 10.6 || 1.7 || 0.5 || 3.2 || align=center|
|-
|align="left"| || align="center"|G || align="left"|Arizona || align="center"|1 || align="center"| || 3 || 11 || 0 || 4 || 1 || 3.7 || 0.0 || 1.3 || 0.3 || align=center|
|-
|align="left" bgcolor="#FFCC00"|+ || align="center"|F/C || align="left"|Oregon State || align="center"|5 || align="center"|– || 329 || 10,080 || 2,132 || 779 || 4,460 || 30.6 || 6.5 || 2.4 || 13.6 || align=center|
|-
|align="left"| || align="center"|F || align="left"|Jackson State || align="center"|1 || align="center"| || 7 || 37 || 7 || 2 || 13 || 5.3 || 1.0 || 0.3 || 1.9 || align=center|
|-
|align="left"| || align="center"|F/C || align="left"|Notre Dame || align="center"|1 || align="center"| || 2 || 8 || 1 || 0 || 2 || 4.0 || 0.5 || 0.0 || 1.0 || align=center|
|-
|align="left" bgcolor="#FFFF99"|^ (#43) || align="center"|F/C || align="left"|Illinois Wesleyan || align="center"|9 || align="center"|– || 715 || 24,707 || bgcolor="#CFECEC"|7,729 || 2,345 || 12,034 || 34.6 || 10.8 || 3.3 || 16.8 || align=center|
|-
|align="left"| || align="center"|F/C || align="left"|Creighton || align="center"|3 || align="center"|– || 246 || 5,724 || 1,677 || 326 || 1,248 || 23.3 || 6.8 || 1.3 || 5.1 || align=center|
|-
|align="left"| || align="center"|F || align="left"|Duke || align="center"|4 || align="center"|– || 138 || 1,877 || 254 || 53 || 437 || 13.6 || 1.8 || 0.4 || 3.2 || align=center|
|-
|align="left"| || align="center"|G/F || align="left"|Maryland Eastern Shore || align="center"|2 || align="center"|– || 145 || 2,798 || 608 || 152 || 660 || 19.3 || 4.2 || 1.0 || 4.6 || align=center|
|-
|align="left"| || align="center"|G || align="left"|Wake Forest || align="center"|1 || align="center"| || 30 || 155 || 27 || 28 || 37 || 5.2 || 0.9 || 0.9 || 1.2 || align=center|
|-
|align="left"| || align="center"|F || align="left"|Maryland || align="center"|1 || align="center"| || 36 || 691 || 163 || 25 || 238 || 19.2 || 4.5 || 0.7 || 6.6 || align=center|
|-
|align="left"| || align="center"|C || align="left"|King College Prep (IL) || align="center"|1 || align="center"| || 1 || 4 || 2 || 0 || 2 || 4.0 || 2.0 || 0.0 || 2.0 || align=center|
|-
|align="left"| || align="center"|G || align="left"|San Francisco || align="center"|2 || align="center"|– || 105 || 1,834 || 199 || 290 || 668 || 17.5 || 1.9 || 2.8 || 6.4 || align=center|
|-
|align="left"| || align="center"|G || align="left"|Michigan State || align="center"|3 || align="center"|– || 127 || 1,238 || 117 || 245 || 339 || 9.7 || 0.9 || 1.9 || 2.7 || align=center|
|-
|align="left"| || align="center"|G/F || align="left"|Davidson || align="center"|6 || align="center"|– || 443 || 13,914 || 1,470 || 1,607 || 6,507 || 31.4 || 3.3 || 3.6 || 14.7 || align=center|
|-
|align="left"| || align="center"|G || align="left"|UNLV || align="center"|2 || align="center"|– || 149 || 2,769 || 202 || 432 || 1,303 || 18.6 || 1.4 || 2.9 || 8.7 || align=center|
|-
|align="left"| || align="center"|C || align="left"|UNLV || align="center"|1 || align="center"| || 1 || 5 || 0 || 0 || 0 || 5.0 || 0.0 || 0.0 || 0.0 || align=center|
|-
|align="left"| || align="center"|G/F || align="left"|Kansas || align="center"|2 || align="center"|– || 144 || 2,244 || 399 || 91 || 906 || 15.6 || 2.8 || 0.6 || 6.3 || align=center|
|-
|align="left"| || align="center"|G || align="left"|Temple || align="center"|1 || align="center"| || 44 || 375 || 24 || 57 || 176 || 8.5 || 0.5 || 1.3 || 4.0 || align=center|
|-
|align="left"| || align="center"|C || align="left"|Georgia || align="center"|2 || align="center"|– || 53 || 515 || 122 || 15 || 202 || 9.7 || 2.3 || 0.3 || 3.8 || align=center|
|-
|align="left"| || align="center"|F || align="left"|Coppin State || align="center"|1 || align="center"| || 70 || 982 || 171 || 52 || 300 || 14.0 || 2.4 || 0.7 || 4.3 || align=center|
|-
|align="left"| || align="center"|F || align="left"|Colorado || align="center"|1 || align="center"| || 3 || 14 || 3 || 1 || 3 || 4.7 || 1.0 || 0.3 || 1.0 || align=center|
|-
|align="left"| || align="center"|G || align="left"|Missouri || align="center"|2 || align="center"|– || 146 || 2,434 || 161 || 445 || 907 || 16.7 || 1.1 || 3.0 || 6.2 || align=center|
|-
|align="left"| || align="center"|C || align="left"|Bakersfield HS (CA) || align="center"|4 || align="center"|– || 97 || 1,500 || 376 || 20 || 416 || 15.5 || 3.9 || 0.2 || 4.3 || align=center|
|-
|align="left"| || align="center"|F || align="left"|Miami (OH) || align="center"|1 || align="center"| || 50 || 1,180 || 136 || 69 || 656 || 23.6 || 2.7 || 1.4 || 13.1 || align=center|
|}

T to Z

|-
|align="left"| || align="center"|G || align="left"|Abraham Lincoln HS (NY) || align="center"|1 || align="center"| || 16 || 327 || 30 || 45 || 134 || 20.4 || 1.9 || 2.8 || 8.4 || align=center|
|-
|align="left"| || align="center"|C || align="left"|UConn || align="center"|2 || align="center"|– || 89 || 962 || 235 || 12 || 187 || 10.8 || 2.6 || 0.1 || 2.1 || align=center|
|-
|align="left"| || align="center"|F || align="left"|Syracuse || align="center"|1 || align="center"| || 23 || 321 || 64 || 1 || 75 || 14.0 || 2.8 || 0.0 || 3.3 || align=center|
|-
|align="left"| || align="center"|F || align="left"|TCU || align="center"|1 || align="center"| || 42 || 1,060 || 369 || 53 || 317 || 25.2 || 8.8 || 1.3 || 7.5 || align=center|
|-
|align="left"| || align="center"|F || align="left"|Duke || align="center"|1 || align="center"| || 22 || 450 || 75 || 20 || 113 || 20.5 || 3.4 || 0.9 || 5.1 || align=center|
|-
|align="left" bgcolor="#FFFF99"|^ || align="center"|G/F || align="left"|NC State || align="center"|2 || align="center"|– || 94 || 2,504 || 314 || 235 || 1,430 || 26.6 || 3.3 || 2.5 || 15.2 || align=center|
|-
|align="left" bgcolor="#FFFF99"|^ || align="center"|G || align="left"|West Virginia || align="center"|4 || align="center"|– || 177 || 3,107 || 467 || 509 || 1,745 || 17.6 || 2.6 || 2.9 || 9.9 || align=center|
|-
|align="left"| || align="center"|G || align="left"|West Virginia Tech || align="center"|4 || align="center"|– || 234 || 5,121 || 364 || 780 || 2,495 || 21.9 || 1.6 || 3.3 || 10.7 || align=center|
|-
|align="left"| || align="center"|F || align="left"|Indiana || align="center"|2 || align="center"|– || 97 || 1,204 || 250 || 56 || 399 || 12.4 || 2.6 || 0.6 || 4.1 || align=center|
|-
|align="left"| || align="center"|F || align="left"|Arkansas || align="center"|3 || align="center"|– || 80 || 681 || 179 || 34 || 402 || 8.5 || 2.2 || 0.4 || 5.0 || align=center|
|-
|align="left"| || align="center"|F/C || align="left"|Seattle || align="center"|2 || align="center"|– || 75 || 2,079 || 629 || 158 || 971 || 27.7 || 8.4 || 2.1 || 12.9 || align=center|
|-
|align="left"| || align="center"|F || align="left"|Oklahoma Baptist || align="center"|2 || align="center"|– || 137 || 3,627 || 922 || 166 || 1,639 || 26.5 || 6.7 || 1.2 || 12.0 || align=center|
|-
|align="left"| || align="center"|G || align="left"|Michigan State || align="center"|1 || align="center"| || 43 || 548 || 49 || 137 || 195 || 12.7 || 1.1 || 3.2 || 4.5 || align=center|
|-
|align="left"| || align="center"|G || align="left"|Georgia Tech || align="center"|1 || align="center"| || 8 || 40 || 1 || 0 || 13 || 5.0 || 0.1 || 0.0 || 1.6 || align=center|
|-
|align="left"| || align="center"|F || align="left"|Utah || align="center"|5 || align="center"|– || 395 || 9,035 || 1,735 || 528 || 2,352 || 22.9 || 4.4 || 1.3 || 6.0 || align=center|
|-
|align="left"| || align="center"|G || align="left"|Syracuse || align="center"|2 || align="center"|– || 125 || 3,574 || 337 || 243 || 1,357 || 28.6 || 2.7 || 1.9 || 10.9 || align=center|
|-
|align="left"| || align="center"|F || align="left"|Virginia || align="center"|5 || align="center"|– || 350 || 6,577 || 1,169 || 531 || 2,543 || 18.8 || 3.3 || 1.5 || 7.3 || align=center|
|-
|align="left"| || align="center"|G || align="left"|UCLA || align="center"|5 || align="center"|– || 311 || 7,764 || 748 || 1,613 || 2,519 || 25.0 || 2.4 || 5.2 || 8.1 || align=center|
|-
|align="left"| || align="center"|G || align="left"|Xavier (LS) || align="center"|5 || align="center"|– || 337 || 9,692 || 1,197 || 2,274 || 3,396 || 28.8 || 3.6 || 6.7 || 10.1 || align=center|
|-
|align="left"| || align="center"|F || align="left"|Illinois || align="center"|1 || align="center"| || 51 || 1,505 || 404 || 51 || 652 || 29.5 || 7.9 || 1.0 || 12.8 || align=center|
|-
|align="left"| || align="center"|G || align="left"|Washington State || align="center"|2 || align="center"|– || 68 || 1,310 || 148 || 112 || 335 || 19.3 || 2.2 || 1.6 || 4.9 || align=center|
|-
|align="left"| || align="center"|C || align="left"|Morgan State || align="center"|1 || align="center"| || 82 || 2,910 || 1,035 || 203 || 1,144 || 35.5 || bgcolor="#CFECEC"|12.6 || 2.5 || 14.0 || align=center|
|-
|align="left"| || align="center"|G || align="left"|Penn State || align="center"|1 || align="center"| || 82 || 1,614 || 150 || 342 || 803 || 19.7 || 1.8 || 4.2 || 9.8 || align=center|
|-
|align="left"| || align="center"|G || align="left"|Saint Joseph's || align="center"|1 || align="center"| || 35 || 727 || 96 || 113 || 239 || 20.8 || 2.7 || 3.2 || 6.8 || align=center|
|-
|align="left" bgcolor="#FFCC00"|+ || align="center"|G || align="left"|UCLA || align="center"|11 || align="center"|– || 821 || 28,330 || 5,760 || 6,897 || bgcolor="#CFECEC"|18,859 || 34.5 || 7.0 || 8.4 || 23.0 || align=center|
|-
|align="left" bgcolor="#FFFF99"|^ || align="center"|G || align="left"|USC || align="center"|1 || align="center"| || 36 || 1,078 || 68 || 148 || 601 || 29.9 || 1.9 || 4.1 || 16.7 || align=center|
|-
|align="left"| || align="center"|F || align="left"|Indiana || align="center"|3 || align="center"|– || 42 || 451 || 107 || 14 || 186 || 10.7 || 2.5 || 0.3 || 4.4 || align=center|
|-
|align="left"| || align="center"|G || align="left"|Arizona State || align="center"|1 || align="center"| || 12 || 165 || 11 || 18 || 39 || 13.8 || 0.9 || 1.5 || 3.3 || align=center|
|-
|align="left"| || align="center"|F || align="left"|Maryland || align="center"|4 || align="center"|– || 210 || 5,916 || 1,494 || 223 || 2,654 || 28.2 || 7.1 || 1.1 || 12.6 || align=center|
|-
|align="left" bgcolor="#FFFF99"|^ (#19) || align="center"|G || align="left"|Providence || align="center"|4 || align="center"|– || 308 || 11,895 || 1,546 || 2,777 || 6,010 || 38.6 || 5.0 || bgcolor="#CFECEC"|9.0 || 19.5 || align=center|
|-
|align="left"| || align="center"|G/F || align="left"|Indiana || align="center"|1 || align="center"| || 78 || 1,552 || 258 || 171 || 526 || 19.9 || 3.3 || 2.2 || 6.7 || align=center|
|-
|align="left"| || align="center"|G/F || align="left"|Georgia || align="center"|5 || align="center"|– || 310 || 6,561 || 802 || 476 || 2,359 || 21.2 || 2.6 || 1.5 || 7.6 || align=center|
|-
|align="left"| || align="center"|G || align="left"|Rice || align="center"|4 || align="center"|– || 64 || 720 || 71 || 102 || 242 || 11.3 || 1.1 || 1.6 || 3.8 || align=center|
|-
|align="left"| || align="center"|F/C || align="left"|Xavier || align="center"|2 || align="center"|– || 105 || 1,215 || 275 || 36 || 454 || 11.6 || 2.6 || 0.3 || 4.3 || align=center|
|-
|align="left" bgcolor="#FFCC00"|+ (#1) || align="center"|G || align="left"|USC || align="center"|6 || align="center"|–– || 477 || 16,262 || 1,429 || 2,865 || 9,676 || 34.1 || 3.0 || 6.0 || 20.3 || align=center|
|-
|align="left"| || align="center"|G || align="left"|St. John's || align="center"|2 || align="center"|– || 145 || 1,787 || 210 || 162 || 821 || 12.3 || 1.4 || 1.1 || 5.7 || align=center|
|-
|align="left"| || align="center"|G || align="left"|Lincoln (MO) || align="center"|1 || align="center"| || 53 || 505 || 47 || 103 || 165 || 9.5 || 0.9 || 1.9 || 3.1 || align=center|
|-
|align="left"| || align="center"|F || align="left"|VMI || align="center"|1 || align="center"| || 3 || 17 || 0 || 1 || 11 || 5.7 || 0.0 || 0.3 || 3.7 || align=center|
|-
|align="left"| || align="center"|G || align="left"|North Carolina || align="center"|3 || align="center"|– || 162 || 2,358 || 247 || 351 || 913 || 14.6 || 1.5 || 2.2 || 5.6 || align=center|
|-
|align="left"| || align="center"|C || align="left"|Cincinnati || align="center"|1 || align="center"| || 77 || 1,236 || 470 || 56 || 467 || 16.1 || 6.1 || 0.7 || 6.1 || align=center|
|-
|align="left"| || align="center"|G || align="left"|North Texas || align="center"|4 || align="center"|– || 277 || 5,477 || 635 || 803 || 2,402 || 19.8 || 2.3 || 2.9 || 8.7 || align=center|
|-
|align="left"| || align="center"|G/F || align="left"|Georgetown || align="center"|4 || align="center"|– || 184 || 2,179 || 209 || 177 || 615 || 11.8 || 1.1 || 1.0 || 3.3 || align=center|
|-
|align="left"| || align="center"|F || align="left"|Cincinnati || align="center"|1 || align="center"| || 20 || 81 || 30 || 3 || 46 || 4.1 || 1.5 || 0.2 || 2.3 || align=center|
|-
|align="left"| || align="center"|F || align="left"|Drake || align="center"|1 || align="center"| || 2 || 10 || 3 || 0 || 1 || 5.0 || 1.5 || 0.0 || 0.5 || align=center|
|-
|align="left"| || align="center"|F || align="left"|Argentina || align="center"|1 || align="center"| || 34 || 305 || 46 || 3 || 75 || 9.0 || 1.4 || 0.1 || 2.2 || align=center|
|-
|align="left"| || align="center"|G/F || align="left"|North Carolina || align="center"|3 || align="center"|– || 239 || 6,530 || 798 || 516 || 3,265 || 27.3 || 3.3 || 2.2 || 13.7 || align=center|
|-
|align="left"| || align="center"|F/C || align="left"|Indiana || align="center"|1 || align="center"| || 77 || 931 || 218 || 36 || 303 || 12.1 || 2.8 || 0.5 || 3.9 || align=center|
|-
|align="left"| || align="center"|G || align="left"|Wake Forest || align="center"|4 || align="center"|– || 235 || 4,358 || 311 || 876 || 1,167 || 18.5 || 1.3 || 3.7 || 5.0 || align=center|
|-
|align="left"| || align="center"|C || align="left"|UCLA || align="center"|1 || align="center"| || 6 || 22 || 4 || 1 || 11 || 3.7 || 0.7 || 0.2 || 1.8 || align=center|
|}

References

External links
 
 Oklahoma City Thunder all-time roster

National Basketball Association all-time rosters
 
 
roster